Mr William Collins is a fictional character in the 1813 novel Pride and Prejudice by Jane Austen. He is the distant cousin of Mr Bennet, a clergyman and holder of a valuable living at the Hunsford parsonage near Rosings Park, the estate of his patroness Lady Catherine De Bourgh, in Kent. Since Mr and Mrs Bennet have no sons, Mr Collins is also the current heir presumptive to the Bennet family estate of Longbourn in Meryton, Hertfordshire, due to the estate being entailed to heirs male. Mr Collins is first introduced during his visit to Longbourn.  His dull-witted character is in parallel to another 'Austen' character, Mr. Rushworth, from Mansfield Park.  Mr Collins is also somewhat comparable to the Shakespearean character, Malvolio, from Twelfth Night.

Background
Mr William Collins, 25 years old as the novel begins, is Mr Bennet's distant cousin, a clergyman, and the heir presumptive to Mr Bennet's estate of Longbourn. The property is entailed to heirs male, meaning that Mr Bennet's daughters and their issue cannot inherit after Mr. Bennet dies. Unless Mr Bennet has a son (which he and Mrs Bennet have no expectation of), the estate of £2,000-per-annum will pass to Mr Collins.

Born to a father who is described as "illiterate and miserly", the son, William Collins is not much better '(sans the miser part)'. The greatest part of his life has been spent under the guidance of his father (who dies shortly before events at the beginning of the novel). The result is a younger Collins who is "not a sensible man, and the deficiency of nature had been but little assisted by education or society": having "belonged to one of the universities" (either Oxford or Cambridge), he "merely kept the necessary terms, without forming at it any useful acquaintance", nor accomplishments. So despite his time spent in university, his view of the world is apparently scarce more informed or profound than Mrs. Bennet's. His manner is obsequious and he readily defers to and flatters his social superiors. Physically, he is described as a "tall, heavy looking young man of five and twenty. His air was grave and stately, and his manners were very formal".

Austen writes that before his entry into the novel, his circumstances in early life, and the 'subjection' in which his father had brought him up, had "originally given him great humility of manner".  However, this characteristic has been "now a good deal counteracted by the self-conceit of a weak head, living in retirement", altered greatly and been replaced with arrogance and vanity due to "early and unexpected prosperity". This early prosperity came, by chance, at the hands of Lady Catherine de Bourgh, when a vacancy arose for the living of the Hunsford parish, "and the respect which he felt for her high rank and his veneration for her as his patroness, mingling with a very good opinion of himself, of his authority as a clergyman, and his rights as a rector, made him altogether a mixture of pride and obsequiousness, self-importance and humility".  He has a ridiculously high regard for Lady Catherine de Bourgh and her daughter, of whom he is "eloquent in their praise".

Elizabeth's rejection of Mr Collins's marriage proposal is welcomed by her father, regardless of the financial benefit to the family of such a match. Mr Collins then marries Elizabeth's friend, Charlotte Lucas.  Mr Collins is usually considered to be the foil to Mr. Darcy, who is grave and serious, and acts with propriety at all times. On the other hand, Mr Collins acts with impropriety and exaggerated humility, which offers some comedic relief.  He likes things, especially if they are expensive or numerous, but is indifferent to true beauty and value ("Here, leading the way through every walk and cross walk, and scarcely allowing them an interval to utter the praises he asked for, every view was pointed out with a minuteness which left beauty entirely behind. He could number the fields in every direction, and could tell how many trees there were in the most distant clump).

Portrayal
 
Mr Collins is first mentioned when Mr Bennet tells his wife that his cousin will be visiting them. Mr Bennet reads them a letter sent to him from Mr Collins, where Collins speaks of making amends for any past disagreements between his father and Mr Bennet. In his letter, it is clear that Mr Collins readily assumes that his overtures of peace will be gratefully accepted, and further presumes upon the family as to announce that he will come stay with them for a week, without even first asking for permission.

Upon the first night of his visit, he spends time dining with the family and reading to them from Fordyce's Sermons in their parlour. It is at this point that Mr Collins seems to take a fancy to the eldest daughter, Jane Bennet. When discussing his intentions with Mrs Bennet he is told that Jane may very soon be engaged. It takes Mr Collins only a few moments to redirect his attentions to Elizabeth Bennet, who he believes, in "birth and beauty", equals her sister.

He spends the rest of his stay making visits around the neighbourhood with the Bennet sisters, minus Mary. They visit Mrs Phillips, Mrs Bennet's sister. Mr Collins is quite charmed by this encounter and seems extremely pleased to be treated so well by the family. He continues to pay specific attention to Miss Elizabeth.

Collins first gives Elizabeth a hint of his intentions prior to the Netherfield ball hosted by Charles Bingley. He asks Elizabeth if she will allow him the pleasure of being her partner for the first two dances. Though Mr Collins quite enjoys himself during these dances, Elizabeth has entirely different feelings on the matter. Miss Elizabeth has a strong aversion for Mr Collins. However, she usually tries to avoid any conversation beyond what is polite and proper. At the Netherfield ball, she describes her dances with Mr Collins as "dances of mortification". She comments that Mr Collins acts awkwardly and solemnly, and gives her "all the shame and misery which a disagreeable partner for a couple of dances can give".

At the end of Mr Collins' week-long visit he seeks a private audience with Miss Elizabeth. Oblivious to how Elizabeth might be feeling, Mr Collins tells her that "almost as soon as he entered the house, he singled her out as the companion of his future life". He also expounds upon his reasons for getting married, which are:  
 He 'feels' that every clergyman should set the example of matrimony in his parish.
 he believes it will add to his own personal happiness.
 Lady Catherine has 'urged' him to find a wife as quickly as possible (contradicting his first reason, cited above).

Mr Collins declares himself to be 'violently in love' with Elizabeth; Elizabeth, however, knows that his professed feelings for her are completely imaginary and that they are a complete mismatch (not wishing for a marriage that would most certainly end up as miserable, like that of her parents, only with the roles reversed), and all of her attempts to dissuade him had been too subtle for him to recognise. When Elizabeth rejects his proposal, despite her mother's approval of the match, Collins is quite taken aback and does not believe that she is serious. Elizabeth has to tell him firmly that she is in fact serious. Mr Collins seems surprised and insulted. He had not considered that his proposal would ever be undesirable. Elizabeth has to insistently repeat to Mr Collins that she does not intend to marry him since he believes she is really only trying to behave with propriety by refusing him. Collins only accepts her refusal once Mrs Bennet admits that it is not likely that Elizabeth intends changing her mind (although she is not happy about the refusal, because she wants one of her daughters to marry the man who will inherit Longbourn). Mrs Bennet goes to Mr Bennet and talks to him about the refusal; she wants him to force Elizabeth to accept him because Elizabeth has great respect for her father. Mr Bennet says that if she accepts Mr. Collins, he will refuse to see her.

A few short days after this rejection, Mr Collins' sentiments are quickly transferred to Elizabeth's particular friend, Charlotte Lucas (who is 27 years old at the time), who encourages his regard because she seeks to improve her own social position (and does not wish to remain a spinster). Since Collins has very good prospects, Charlotte is determined to gain his favour. Her plan works well: a few days after this, Elizabeth hears that Charlotte is now engaged to Mr Collins. Upon hearing this news from Charlotte herself, Elizabeth declares it to be impossible and wonders how it is that someone could find Mr Collins less than ridiculous, let alone choose to marry him. This engagement takes place rather quickly and later, Mr Collins comes to visit the Bennets with his new wife to pay their respects. Charlotte Lucas married him to make the most of an opportunity as she is growing older and is becoming less likely to get married; she does not think love is essential for a good marriage.

A few months later Elizabeth is invited to visit Charlotte at her new home in Hunsford for Easter. Mr Collins makes it his goal to show Elizabeth that she made a grave mistake when refusing to marry him (and is dissatisfied when she does not express any regret.) Later on, he seems intent on convincing the Bennets that his pride was never injured and that he never had intentions towards Elizabeth (almost acting as if he was the one who rejected her), or any of her sisters.

Mr Collins appears in the novel only a few more times, usually via letters. After Lydia Bennet elopes with the duplicitous Mr Wickham he sends a letter of consolation to Mr Bennet, in which his sympathetic tone is confusingly contrasted with his advice to cast Lydia out of the family lest her disgrace reflects on the rest of the family. His respect for Lady Catherine leads him to alert her to a rumour he hears from his wife's family suggesting that Mr. Darcy and Elizabeth will soon be engaged. This causes Lady Catherine to travel to Meryton to demand Elizabeth end her relationship with Darcy and plays a significant role in the sequence of events that leads to Darcy and Elizabeth's engagement. At the end of the novel, Lady Catherine's fury at the engagement leads Collins and Charlotte, who is by now expecting a child, to take an extended visit to Charlotte's parents until they can no longer be the targets of her rage.

Extra-textual information
Some scholarly analysis has been conducted on Jane Austen's characterization of Mr Collins. Possibly the most thorough examination of this character was made by Ivor Morris in his book Mr Collins Considered: Approaches to Jane Austen. Morris says "there is no one quite like Mr Collins [...] his name has become a byword for a silliness all of his own—a felicitous blend of complacent self-approval and ceremonious servility." He continues to say that Austen designed Mr Collins as a flat character, yet he is one of her great accomplishments. Morris suggests that though Mr Collins has few dimensions, he is just as rounded as Sense and Sensibility's Edward Ferrars and Colonel Brandon, or Emma's Mr Knightley and Harriet Smith.

In another analysis, Deirdre Le Faye wrote "what does make Mr Collins a figure of fun and rightful mockery is his lack of sense, of taste, and of generosity of spirit contrasted to his own supreme unawareness of his shortcomings in these respects".  He has also been criticized for taking such a casual view of his own marriage, which is one of the primary concerns of the Church.

In a book review written by Dinah Birch, a professor at the University of Liverpool, she examines the role of Mr Collins as a clergyman in Jane Austen's writing. Birch says that "one of the strongest points of Pride and Prejudice is its understanding that Jane Austen's Christianity ... is also an imaginative force in her writing", because Austen is "deeply interested in the role of the church", in her society. She writes about the lack of religious dedication she sees in some clergymen through her character Mr Collins who is "by no means an aspirant to sainthood".

Depictions in other media

Film

Television

References

Fictional priests and priestesses
Pride and Prejudice characters
Literary characters introduced in 1813
Fictional gentry